Mese may refer to:
Chikako Mese, American mathematician
Mese, Burma, a town in Kayah State of eastern Myanmar
Mese, Lombardy, a comune (municipality) in the province of Sondrio, Italy
 Mese, the Hungarian name for Meşendorf village, Buneşti Commune, Braşov County, Romania
Mese (mythology), one of the three Muses of the lyre that were worshipped at Delphi
Mese (Constantinople), the main road of Constantinople
Mese, Ancient Greek comedy of the middle period, 385-323 BCE
Matsya Kingdom, an Indian/Central Asian kingdom, classically called the Mese or Mesë